There have been three baronetcies created for persons with the surname Foster, all in the Baronetage of the United Kingdom. Two of the creations are extinct.

The Foster Baronetcy, of Glyde Court in the County of Louth, was created in the Baronetage of the United Kingdom on 30 September 1831 for the diplomat Augustus Foster. The title became extinct on the death of the fourth Baronet in 1947.

The Foster Baronetcy, of Norwich in the County of Norfolk, was created in the Baronetage of the United Kingdom on 3 August 1838 for William Foster. The title became extinct on the death of the fourth Baronet in 1960.

The Foster Baronetcy, of Bloomsbury in the County of London, was created in the Baronetage of the United Kingdom on 5 February 1930 for the university administrator and educationalist Gregory Foster. He was Provost of University College London between 1907 and 1929 and Vice-Chancellor of the University of London between 1928 and 1930.

Foster baronets, of Glyde Court (1831) 

Sir Augustus John Foster, 1st Baronet (1780–1848) . Son of Lady Elizabeth Foster. He married 1815 Albina Hobart, daughter of Hon. George Vere Hobart. He was knighted 1825 and raised to a baronetcy 1831. The influence of his stepfather William Cavendish, 5th Duke of Devonshire was exercised at the instance of his mother, the Duke's second Duchess. The first baronet, who committed suicide, was succeeded by his eldest son
Sir Frederick George Foster, 2nd Baronet (1816–1857) who died unmarried, and was succeeded by his next brother
Rev. Sir Cavendish Hervey Foster, 3rd Baronet (1817–1890) md 1844 Isabella Todd. He was a clergyman who served as rector of Theydon Garnon 1843–1887. Both their sons predeceased their father. Their elder son was Major John Frederick Foster (1847–1890) died six months before his father. He was the father of
Sir Augustus Vere Foster, 4th Baronet (1873–1947), son of John Frederick Foster and his wife Caroline Emily Marsh. He married 25 October Charlotte Philippa Marion ffolkes, 3rd and youngest daughter of Rev. Henry Everard ffolkes, uncle and heir presumptive to Sir William ffolkes, 3rd Bt. (1847–1912), and sister of the fourth and fifth baronets. They had issue 1 son (died in his father's lifetime) and 2 daughters.
 Philippa Eugenie (Biddy) Vere Foster (1898–1962)
 Dorothy Elizabeth Charlotte Vere Foster (1903–)
 Anthony Vere Foster (21 February 1908 – 1934)
The last baronet's sister Alice was paternal grandmother of Anna Wintour.

The baronetcy became extinct in 1947.

Foster baronets, of Norwich (1838) 

Sir William Foster, 1st Baronet (1798–1874)
Sir William Foster, 2nd Baronet (1825–1911)
Sir William Yorke Foster, 3rd Baronet (1860–1948)
Sir Henry William Berkeley Foster, 4th Baronet (1892–1960)

Foster baronets, of Bloomsbury (1930) 
Sir (Thomas) Gregory Foster, 1st Baronet (1866–1931)
Sir Thomas Saxby Gregory Foster, 2nd Baronet (1899–1957)
Sir John Gregory Foster, 3rd Baronet (1927–2006)
Sir Saxby Gregory Foster, 4th Baronet (born 1957)

The heir apparent to the baronetcy is Thomas James Gregory (born 1991), son of the 4th Baronet.

Gallery

See also
Sir William Foster (historiographer) (1863–1951), British historiographer and civil servant knighted in 1925

Notes

References 
Kidd, Charles, Williamson, David (editors). Debrett's Peerage and Baronetage (1990 edition). New York: St Martin's Press, 1990, 

Brian Masters, Georgiana Duchess of Devonshire, Hamish Hamilton, London, 1981 (page 298-299-re. Fosters of Glyde Court).

Baronetcies in the Baronetage of the United Kingdom
Extinct baronetcies in the Baronetage of the United Kingdom